The Big Cypress Indian Reservation is one of the six reservations of the Seminole Tribe of Florida. It is located in southeastern Hendry County and northwestern Broward County, in southern Florida, United States. Its location is on the Atlantic coastal plain. This reservation lies south of Lake Okeechobee and just north of Alligator Alley. It is governed by the Seminole Tribe of Florida's Tribal Council, and is the largest of the five Seminole reservations in the state. Facilities on the reservation include the tribal museum and a major entertainment and rodeo complex.

The land area is 81.972 sq mi (212.306 km²), including the 12th-largest cattle operation in the country. A resident population of 591 persons was reported in the 2010 census. The reservation is also called "Big Cypress Seminole Indian Reservation" or "Big Cypress Reservation". It lies adjacent to the north side of the largest section of the Miccosukee Indian Reservation in western Broward County.

Climate

Tourism and entertainment

The tribe owns two tourist attractions here: Billie Swamp Safari, and Big Cypress National Preserve.

The American rock band Phish held their millennium concert at the reservation from December 30, 1999, to January 1, 2000. With 85,000 people in attendance, it was the earliest and largest sold-out millennium concert. Phish performed three sets of music on the 30th, an afternoon set on the 31st, and an unprecedented "Midnight To Dawn" set, which ran from 11:50pm until sunrise on January 1, 2000.

The entertainment complex is surrounded by 350 acres for outdoor events, in addition to a newly renovated rodeo arena with seating for 3,000 people. Stables have stalls for 86 horses.

The tribe constructed the Ah-Tah-Thi-Ki Seminole Indian Museum, which opened in 1997. In 2005 it was the first tribal museum to receive accreditation from the American Association of Museums (AAM), and is a Smithsonian Institution Affiliate.

Education
The tribal school is the Ahfachkee School.

Notes

References
 Eda.gov 
 Big Cypress Reservation, Florida United States Census Bureau

American Indian reservations in Florida
Populated places in Broward County, Florida
Populated places in Hendry County, Florida
Indigenous topics of the Southeastern Woodlands
Seminole Tribe of Florida